Birkenhead is a town on the Wirral Peninsula, in north west England.
Birkenhead (UK Parliament constituency), related constituency
Birkenhead and Tranmere (ward), current Wirral Council ward (2004–present)
Birkenhead (ward), Wirral Council ward (1980–2004)

Birkenhead may also refer to:

In places:
 Birkenhead, New Zealand, a suburb in North Shore, Auckland, New Zealand
 Birkenhead (New Zealand electorate), related constituency
 Birkenhead, South Australia, a suburb of Adelaide
 Birkenhead Peak, British Columbia, Canada, and these nearby places:
 Birkenhead River
 Birkenhead Lake Provincial Park, northwest of Birkenhead Peak and Gates Lake
 Birkenhead Rock, near Gansbaai, Western Cape, South Africa, on which HMS Birkenhead (1845) was wrecked
 Birkenhead, Western Cape, a populated place near Gansbaai in South Africa
 Birkenhead Point, New South Wales, a point in Sydney, Australia

In ships:
 , an iron-hulled troopship launched in 1845 and notably wrecked in 1852 with the loss of 450 lives
 , a Town-class light cruiser launched in 1915, in action at the Battle of Jutland, and sold in 1921

In people:
 Bishop of Birkenhead, an episcopal title
 Earl of Birkenhead, an extinct title in the Peerage of the United Kingdom
 F. E. Smith, 1st Earl of Birkenhead (1872–1930), British Conservative politician, Lord High Chancellor (1919–1922)
 Frederick Smith, 2nd Earl of Birkenhead (1907–1975), British biographer and Member of the House of Lords
 Frederick Smith, 3rd Earl of Birkenhead (1936–1985), British writer, historian and hereditary peer
 John Birkenhead (c. 1617–1879), British political writer and journalist
 Lillian Birkenhead (1905–1979), British swimmer
 Richie Birkenhead (born 1965), American rock musician and creative director
 Susan Birkenhead, American lyricist
 Frank Field, Baron Field of Birkenhead (born 1942), British Labour politician

In other uses:
 The Birkenhead drill, the marine evacuation protocol originated during the sinking of HMS Birkenhead (1845)

See also
 Birkenhead Point Factory Outlet Centre, a shopping centre in Sydney, Australia 
 Birken, British Columbia, whose name is derived from the Birkenhead River and the adjacent Birkenhead Peak